Kolski may refer to:
Allan Kolski Horwitz (born 1952), South African poet 
Grażyna Błęcka-Kolska (born 1962), Polish actress
Jakub Kolski (1899–1941), Polish chess master
Jan Jakub Kolski (born 1956), Polish film director, cinematographer, and writer
Joe Hernandez-Kolski, American actor
Koło County (powiat kolski), a powiat in Poland
Kolski, alternative spelling of Kolsky